The eighth season of the Dragon Ball Z anime series contains the Babidi and Majin Buu arcs, which comprises Part 2 of the Buu Saga. The episodes are produced by Toei Animation, and are based on the final 26 volumes of the Dragon Ball manga series by Akira Toriyama. 

The 34-episode season originally ran from March 1994 to January 1995 in Japan on Fuji Television. The first English airing of the series was on Cartoon Network where Funimation Entertainment dub of the series ran from October 2001 to October 2002.

Funimation released the season in a box set on February 10, 2009, and in June 2009, announced that they would be re-releasing Dragon Ball Z in a new seven volume set called the "Dragon Boxes". Based on the original series masters with frame-by-frame restoration, the first set was released November 10, 2009.


Episode list

References

1994 Japanese television seasons
1995 Japanese television seasons
Z (season 8)